Tadcaster Grammar School founded in 1557, is a coeducational secondary school and sixth form located near Tadcaster, North Yorkshire, England, educating children aged 11–18 years old, and has an on-site sixth form. 
The school is located in the hamlet of Toulston just outside the brewery town of Tadcaster. The school's catchment includes Tadcaster and its surrounding villages, while traditionally taking pupils from the York area, including villages such as Appleton Roebuck, Copmanthorpe, Bishopthorpe and Bilbrough.

History 

The school was founded in 1557 by Owen Oglethorpe, Bishop of Carlisle, as a boys' school in Tadcaster. It merged with Dawson's Girls' School at the beginning of the 20th century.

In 1960 it moved to the site of Toulston Lodge, just outside Tadcaster. Although Toulston Lodge has now been converted into classrooms, as opposed to living quarters, the original fireplace is still in place, as is the skylight and the wooden elephants that surround it. There is a claim that Toulston Lodge once belonged to Oliver Cromwell.

Since 2000 new school buildings added include a science block, library and an extension to the design technology block. In addition, a new sixth-form block was constructed which also houses religious education classrooms, and there is a new entrance area with three business classrooms. Overall it includes three business rooms, one law room, three computer rooms, two science classrooms and three religious education rooms. In 2020, the religious education classrooms were converted to life skills classrooms, as the former rooms were moved to be closer to other humanities.

During the summer of 2006 a new entrance was built with automatic doors, a new disabled ramp was built for access to the science block and a new path was built along the school car park to the pottery shed. Also, during summer 2009, a new disabled ramp was built for access into the English temporary buildings. New wooden fencing was added in and around the school car park. Another addition to the school was a wooden sculpture at the entrance. This was erected in memory of the fallen Old Tree, formerly a school landmark since the change of site in 1960.

The school became a specialist Business and Enterprise College in 2003 and received High Performing Specialist School Status in 2007, with the school achieving some of the best GCSE and A-Level results in the county of North Yorkshire. In May 2012 the school received an Ofsted rating of 'Good' overall, with 'Outstanding' behaviour and safety of pupils. The school has retained its name but is now a comprehensive school. Originally under the grammar school system, pupils who failed their 11-plus exam would have attended Wetherby Secondary Modern School. Since Tadcaster is now in the district of Selby and Wetherby is in the City of Leeds, it is a difficult and bureaucratic process to educate pupils on the opposite side of the borderline to where they live. Although the school is most commonly organised through vertical forms, there do exist six houses, the established houses of Oglethorpe and Dawson, named after the two merging schools' founders, Fairfax, after the English Civil War commander-in-chief and alumnus Thomas Fairfax and Calcaria, the Roman name for Tadcaster, with two new houses, Toulston and Wharfe, whose names were selected by pupils.

Previously a community school administered by North Yorkshire County Council, in May 2018 Tadcaster Grammar School converted to academy status. The school is now sponsored by The STAR Multi Academy Trust.

Since 2019, the headteacher has been Andrew Parkinson.

Houses 
School houses, into which the pupils of Tadcaster Grammar School are divided, are:
 Oglethorpe House — after Owen Oglethorpe, Bishop of Carlisle, and founder of the school in 1557. Green
 Dawson House — after Dawson's Girls' School, with which Tadcaster Grammar School was merged. Yellow
 Fairfax House — after English Civil War commander-in-chief and alumnus Thomas Fairfax. Blue
 Calcaria House — after the Roman name for Tadcaster. Red
 Toulston House — after school building Toulston Lodge, former residence of Oliver Cromwell. Orange

Notable former pupils 

Alumni of Tadcaster Grammar School are referred to as 'Old Tadites'. Some notable 'Tadites' include:
Ruby Barker – actress
Ed Bicknell – musician
Paul Blomfield – Labour Party politician
David Brown – professional footballer
Lewis Cook – England international footballer
Jon Craig – political journalist
Thomas Fairfax, 3rd Lord Fairfax of Cameron – English Civil War Parliamentary commander-in-chief
Mark Ford – professional footballer
Glamour of the Kill – Heavy Rock band
Grammatics – Alternative rock band
Ross Greenwood – professional footballer
Charles Hague, violinist and composer
Matthew Kilgallon – professional footballer
 Alison Lloyd – fashion designer and founder of Ally Capellino
Thomas Potter – industrialist and Liberal politician
Humphrey Smith – businessman and owner of Samuel Smith Brewery
John and Samuel Smith – founders of John Smith's Brewery and Samuel Smith Brewery
Thomas Staniforth - professional footballer
Adelle Stripe – writer
Charlie Taylor – professional footballer
Rory Watson – professional footballer
Mark Westaby – strongman

References

External links

 Official school website
 

Educational institutions established in the 1550s
1557 establishments in England
Secondary schools in North Yorkshire
Academies in North Yorkshire
Tadcaster